This is a list of golf courses in the Philippines.

Luzon

Metro Manila

Las Piñas
 Southlinks Golf Club (no longer operational )
 Almanza Dos

Makati
 Manila Golf and Country Club
 Forbes Park

Mandaluyong
 Wack Wack Golf and Country Club

Manila
 Club Intramuros Golf Course 
 Intramuros, Manila
 Malacañang Golf Club
 Paco, Manila

Muntinlupa
 Alabang Country Club
 Ayala Alabang Village, Muntinlupa

Pasay
 Villamor Air Base Golf Club

Quezon City
 Camp Aguinaldo Golf Club
 Capitol Hills Golf & Country Club (not operational)
 Veterans Golf Course

Taguig
 Philippine Navy Golf Club
 Philippine Army Golf Club (Kagitingan)

Benguet
 Baguio Country Club
Camp John Hay, Baguio
 Camp John Hay Golf Club
Camp John Hay, Baguio
Pinewoods Golf and Country Club
Baguio
Lepanto Golf Club 
Mankayan

Batangas
 Calatagan Golf Club
Calatagan
 Canyon Woods Resort Club (9 holes)
Laurel, (along Tagaytay Ridge)
 KC Hillcrest (No longer operational) (formerly known as Evercrest Golf Club and Resort)
Kilometer 72, Batulao, Nasugbu
 Mount Malarayat Golf & Country Club (27 hole, Makulot, Lobo, and Malipunyo nines) 
Lipa
 Club Punta Fuego (9 holes) 
Barangay Balaytigue, Nasagbu
 Summit Point Golf & Country Club
Lipa
 Fernando Airbase Golf Club
Lipa
 Splendido Taal Golf Club
Laurel
 Tagaytay Midlands :Talisay (27 holes)

Bulacan
 Royal Northwoods Golf & Country Club
Coral na Bato, San Rafael
 Cattle Creek Golf Club 
Sapang Palay, San Jose del Monte

Bicol Region
 Pili Grove Golf Club :Pili, Camarines Sur 
Apuao Grande Island Golf Course (known as the Swagman Golf Club)
Mercedes, Daet
Doña Pepita Golf Course
Santo Domingo, Albay
Haciendas de Naga
Naga

Cavite
 Eagle Ridge Golf & Country Club (72 holes, Aoki, Norman, Dye and Faldo courses.) 
Barangay Javalera, Gen. Trias
Manila Southwoods Golf & Country Club (36 holes, Masters and Legends courses)
1 Southwoods Avenue, Cabilang Baybay, Carmona
 Zamora Championship Course at Puerto Azul 
Barangay Sapang, Ternate 
 Riviera Golf and Country Club (36 holes, Langer and Couples courses)
along Aguinaldo Highway in Silang near Tagaytay
 Riviera Sports and Country Club (9 hole par-3 course)
Silang
 Royale Tagaytay Country Club , 9 hole course
E. Aguinaldo Highway, Buck Estate Alfonso
 Sherwood Hills Golf Club
Brgy. Cabezas and Lailana, Trece Martires
 South Forbes Golf Club
Brgy. Inchican, Silang Cavite
 Tagaytay Highlands 
Tagaytay Highlands, Tagaytay
 The Orchard Golf & Country Club
Km 27 E. Aguilnado Highway, Dasmariñas

Ilocos Norte
 Fort Ilocandia Resort Hotel (status uncertain)
Calayab, Laoag

La Union
 The Cliffs Golf and Beach Club
San Fernando, La Union

Laguna
 Caliraya Springs Golf & Country Club (36 holes)
Cavinti, Laguna
 Canlubang Golf & Country Club (36 holes, North and South courses)
Canlubang
 Canlubang Sugar Estate, also known as Old Canlubang, 9 holes
Canlubang
 Sta. Elena Golf and Country Club (27 holes) 
Diezmo, Cabuyao
The Country Club Of the Philippines 
Santa Rosa,
 Filipinas Golf Hallow Ridge. (formerly KC Filipinas, TAT Filipinas Golf Club and the Holiday Hills Golf & Country Club)
San Pedro
 Ayala Greenfield Golf Course
Ayala Greenfield Estates, Calamba

Mindoro
Ponderosa Golf Club
Puerto Galera

Marinduque
 Fantasy Elephant Club
Barangay Lipata, Buenavista
Marcopper Golf Course (status uncertain)
Sta. Cruz

Palawan
 Puerto Princesa Golf Club/ Western Front Golf Course
Puerto Princesa
 Rio Tuba Nickel Mining Corporation Golf Course/Mt. Bulanjao Golf Course :Rio Tuba

Olongapo
 Subic International Golf Club 
  Subic Bay Freeport Zone
  www.subicgolf.com

Pampanga
 MPLI (Malabon Property Landholdings Inc.) formerly Angeles Sports & Country Club 
 Clark Sun Valley Country Club (36 holes)
Clark Freeport Zone
 Mimosa Golf & Country Club (36 holes, the Mountainview and Acacia-Lakeview courses)
Clark Freeport Zone
 Fontana Leisure Parks And Casino (not operational) 
Clark Freeport Zone
 Marina Hills Golf Course (not operational)
Mabalacat
 Royal Garden Golf Club (undergoing rehabilitation, currently closed)
Friendship Hwy, Angeles
 FA Korea Country Club (36 holes, Upper and Lower courses) 
Clark Freeport Zone
 Pradera Verde Golf Club, Lubao, Pampanga. (27 holes) 
 Beverly Place Golf Club, Mexico, Pampanga.
 Basa Air Base Golf Club, Floridablanca (9 holes)

Pangasinan
Dagupan Golf and Beach Club 
San Fabian - Bonuan - Dagupan Diversion Road, Bonuan

Rizal

 Eastridge Golf Club
Bo. Bilibiran, Binangonan
 Forest Hills Golf & Country Club (36 holes, Nicklaus and Palmer courses.)
Brgy. Inarawan San Isidro Cogeo Antipolo
 Valley Golf and Country Club (36 holes, North and South courses)  
Don Celso S. Tuason Avenue, Antipolo
 Sun Valley Golf & Country Club
Antipolo
 Camp Capinpin Golf Course :Camp Capinpin Army Base, Tanay (9 holes, limited access to the public)

Tarlac
 Luisita Golf and Country Club
Hacienda Luisita, San Miguel

 Camp Servillano Aquino Golf Club
Camp Aquino, San Miguel

 New Asia Golf Resort and Spa
O'Donnell, Capas

 Sky Blue Golf Course and Resort (under construction)
 Maruglu, Capas

Bataan

 Anvaya Cove Golf & Country Club
Morong
 Peninsula Golf Club / Petron Bataan Golf Course 
Limay (status uncertain) 
 Camaya Coast 
Mariveles

Nueva Ecija
Lakewood Golf and Country Club, Inc.
Sumacab Este, Cabanatuan

Isabela
 Isabela Golf Club
Ilagan
 Perfect Star Golf Course, formerly UPI Hills Golf & Country Club
Gamu

Zambales
National Education and Training Command (NEDTC) Golf and Recreational Facility
Naval Station Leovigildo Gantioqui, San Miguel

Visayas

Bacolod
 Bacolod Golf & Country
Hacienda Binitin, Murcia
 Negros Occidental Golf & Country Club
Bata Subdivision, Bacolod
 Victorias Golf Club 
 Victorias City Negros Occidental,

Boracay
 Fairways and Bluewater Golf & Country Club
Newcoast, Balabag, Boracay Island, Aklan

Cebu
 Alta Vista Golf & Country Club
Aznar Road, Pardo Hills, Cebu City
 Cebu Country Club
Gov. M Cuenco, Banilad, Cebu City
 Cebu International Golf and Resort (not operational at the moment)
Barangay Lambug, Badian, Cebu
 Green Island Golf & Beach Resort
Barangay Lambug, Badian
 Verdemar Golf
203 GCA Bldg., 13 Banilad Rd, Banilad, San Remigio
 Club Filipino de Cebu
Danao, Cebu
 Queens Island Golf Club 
Medellin Nr. Cebu Island 
Mercedes Golf Club 
Medellin Nr.Cebu Island.
Liloan Golf Course and Leisure Estates 
Liloan, Cebu
Mactan Island Golf Club 
Mactan-Benito Ebuen Airbase, Lapulapu City

Iloilo
 Iloilo Golf and Country Club (known as Sta. Barbara)
Sta. Barbara, Iloilo
The Iloilo Golf and Country Club, Inc. is the home of the Sta. Barbara Golf Course, the oldest existing golf course in Southeast Asia (est. 1907). It has a challenging 18-hole golf course (6,056 yards) carved into the hills of Sta. Barbara, Iloilo.

Leyte

 San Juanico Golf Course and Hotel
Cabalawan, Tacloban
 Ormoc City Golf Course
Ormoc City, Leyte

Negros Oriental
 Ang Tay Golf Club ( 9  holes) 
 Dumaguete 
 Negros International Golf and Country Club (newly renovated and reopened)
 Tanjay-Sta.Catalina Rd, Pamplona, Negros Oriental
 Bravo Hotel & Golf 
 Sibulan, 6201 Negros Oriental

Mindanao

Agusan del Norte
West Highlands Golf Club

Lanao del Sur
MSU Kalilang Golf and Country Club :Marawi City

Cagayan de Oro
Pueblo de Oro Golf & Country Club
Pueblo Golf Estates
 Camp Evangelista Golf Club

Maguindanao
Illana Bay Golf Club
Camp Gen S.K. Pendatun, Parang

Misamis Occidental
Mt. Malindang Golf Course : Ozamiz

Bukidnon
 Del Monte Golf Course & Country Club
Manolo Fortich

Iligan
 Golf and Country Club of Iligan, Inc.

Davao 
 Apo Golf & Country Club
Barangay Bago, Davao City
 Rancho Palos Verdes
Barangay Mandug (Buhangin District)
 South Pacific Golf Club and Residential Estates 
 Talomo, Davao City, Davao del Sur.
 Don Paco Rocamora Golf and Country Club 
 Dahican, Mati

South Cotabato

Brittannika Golf Club :Tupi, South Cotabato
Dole Kalsangi Golf Club : Polomolok
Paraiso Golf Course : Koronadal

Zamboanga

 Zamboanga Golf and Country Club
Zamboanga City
 Edwin Andrews Air Base Golf & Country Club
Zamboanga City

Zamboanga Del Norte
 Dakak Golf Club :Dapitan

Sarangani
 Sarangani Golf & Country Club
Malungon

References

Golf clubs and courses in the Philippines